George Abbotts or Abbot (1602–1645) was an English politician who sat in the House of Commons  between  1640 and 1645.

Biography
Abbotts was born in Middlesex, the son of Sir Maurice Abbot(ts). He matriculated at Balliol College, Oxford on 15 October 1619, aged 17 and was awarded BA on  28 February 1622. In 1622 he became a fellow of Merton College, Oxford and was awarded M.A. on 20 May 1625. He was incorporated at Cambridge University in 1627 and was awarded B.C.L. on 16 November 1630.

In April 1640, Abbotts was elected Member of Parliament for Guildford in the Short Parliament and supported the Parliamentary (Roundhead) cause. He was re-elected MP for Guildford in the Long Parliament in November 1640 and sat until his death. In July 1641 he wanted  to resign his seat, but his  request was not granted.

References

1602 births
1645 deaths
People from Middlesex
Alumni of Balliol College, Oxford
Alumni of the University of Cambridge
Fellows of Merton College, Oxford
English MPs 1640 (April)
English MPs 1640–1648
Roundheads